Thomas J. Geary (January 18, 1854 – July 6, 1929) was a U.S. Representative from California from 1890 to 1895.

Biography 
Born in Boston, Massachusetts, Geary moved with his parents to San Francisco, California, in April 1863.
He attended the public schools.
He studied law at St. Ignatius College.
He was admitted to the bar in 1877 and commenced practice in Petaluma, California, moving to Santa Rosa, California, in 1882.
He served as district attorney of Sonoma County, California, in 1883 and 1884.
He resumed the practice of law.

Congress 
Geary was elected as a Democrat to the Fifty-first Congress to fill the vacancy caused by the resignation of John J. De Haven.
He was reelected to the Fifty-second and Fifty-third Congresses and served from December 9, 1890, to March 3, 1895.
He was an unsuccessful candidate for reelection in 1894 to the Fifty-fourth Congress.

Representative Geary and wrote and sponsored the Geary Act, a United States law passed by Congress on May 5, 1892, that extended the Chinese Exclusion Act of 1882. It added onerous new requirements, such as requiring every Chinese residents of the United States to carry a resident permit at all times. Failure to carry the permit was punishable by deportation or a year of hard labor. In addition, Chinese citizens were not allowed to bear witness in court, and could not receive bail in habeas corpus proceedings.

Later career and death 
After losing his bid for reelection, Geary resumed his practice of law. He moved to Nome, Alaska, in 1900 in junction with the Gold Rush going on there at the time, to San Francisco, California, in 1902, and returned to Santa Rosa, California, in 1903, continuing the practice of law. He retired from active pursuits in 1923.

He died in Santa Rosa, California, July 6, 1929.
He was interred in Rural Cemetery.

See also

 John P. Irish of Oakland, opponent of Geary

References

1854 births
1929 deaths
Democratic Party members of the United States House of Representatives from California